Endeavor Air is a United States regional airline headquartered at the Minneapolis–Saint Paul International Airport in Minneapolis, Minnesota, United States. The airline is a wholly owned subsidiary of Delta Air Lines and staffs, operates and maintains aircraft used on Delta Connection flights that are scheduled, marketed and sold by Delta Air Lines.

The airline was founded as Express Airlines I in 1985 and was renamed Pinnacle Airlines in 2002. In 2012, Pinnacle's parent company filed for Chapter 11 reorganization, then emerged as a wholly owned subsidiary of Delta Air Lines. The airline was renamed Endeavor Air on August 1, 2013.

Its corporate headquarters are located in Delta Air Lines Building C, on the property of Minneapolis–Saint Paul International Airport. It has hubs in Atlanta, Cincinnati, Detroit, Minneapolis/St. Paul, and New York's LaGuardia and JFK airports. Until the restructuring, Endeavor also operated a hub in Memphis.

History

Express Airlines I 
In February 1985, the airline was established as Express Airlines I, offering regional airline service to major airlines. The airline's founder, Michael J. Brady, had planned to create several regional airlines under parent company Phoenix Airline Services, Inc, hence the roman numeral "I" in the name.  A second company, established as Express Airlines II (known as "Express II"), was created by spinning off Express I's operations at Minneapolis–Saint Paul International Airport to a separate entity. However, Express II contracted with Express I to provide crew scheduling, operational control, and training.  Express II was later recombined back into Express I.

Express I began its first code-sharing agreement, in May 1985, with Republic Airlines. Republic was the dominant carrier in Memphis but, in keeping with the hub-and-spoke concept, wanted to add more smaller cities and free up its larger DC-9 jets to serve longer stage-length routes. Express I accomplished this by adding service, operating as Republic Express, to three cities using BAe Jetstream 31 aircraft. Within six months, Express Airlines I was operating in ten markets using nine Jetstream 31s and two Saab 340 aircraft.

By its first anniversary, Republic Express, as the service was known, was operating 20 Jetstream 31s and seven Saab 340s in 32 markets. Following regulatory and shareholder approvals, Northwest Airlines acquired Republic Airlines on October 1, 1986. Subsequently, the Republic Express brand merged with the Northwest Airlink brand.

Over the next decade, Express I provided airline services as Northwest Airlink to 56 cities in the Southeast and upper Mid-West. In 1997, Northwest Airlines bought Express I from Phoenix Airline Services. On April 1, 1997, Express I became a wholly owned subsidiary of Northwest Airlines. In order to consolidate the many Airlink systems operated at that time, Express I ceased flying from Minneapolis-St. Paul, and instead concentrated on the Memphis hub.

In August 1997, Express I moved its corporate headquarters to Memphis, allowing all the various departments to function from its main base of operations. On May 7, 2000, Express I became the launch operator of the Bombardier Canadair Regional Jet (CRJ) at Northwest.

Express I further expanded with the development of three additional Maintenance, Repair, Overhaul (MRO) facilities related to CRJ operations. The primary CRJ MRO is located in Knoxville, Tennessee, and is capable of handling up to four aircraft undercover. There were two additional CRJ maintenance sites located in Indiana at South Bend and Fort Wayne, but both were closed after the bankruptcy.

Pinnacle Airlines 
On May 8, 2002, Express Airlines changed its name to Pinnacle Airlines. A new holding company, Pinnacle Airlines Corporation, had been created earlier that year. Pinnacle Airlines, Inc was moved from Northwest Airlines, Inc to Pinnacle Airlines Corporation. Over the next decade, the parent company acquired other airlines, such as Colgan Air and Mesaba Airlines.

In 2006, Northwest agreed to a new Air Service Agreement (ASA) that contracted Pinnacle to fly 124 CRJs until 2017. A clause within the ASA stipulated that if Pinnacle and the Air Line Pilots Association did not agree on a new pilot contract by March 31, 2007, then Northwest could remove up to 17 CRJs from Pinnacle's fleet. After the deadline passed with no new pilot contract, Northwest exercised its right to remove 17 CRJs from Pinnacle, starting in September 2008 at a rate of two CRJs per month. These 17 CRJs were handed over to Mesaba Airlines in 2008, which Pinnacle's parent company later acquired in 2010.

Northwest had also allowed Pinnacle to seek flying for other carriers. On April 30, 2007, Pinnacle Airlines Corp. signed a 10-year contract with Delta Air Lines to be a Delta Connection carrier. The 16 CRJ-900s began delivery in November 2007 and the deliveries were completed in May 2009. The first batch of delivered aircraft was based in Atlanta and began service in December 2007. On June 10, 2008, Pinnacle announced that Delta planned to withdraw from the contract by July 31, 2008, for failure to make its timetable. However, on July 18, 2008, Delta announced that an agreement had been reached that would allow Pinnacle to continue flying for Delta under the terms of the initial contract. The remaining 4 CRJ-900s would be delivered between January and May 2009, at which point all 15 CRJ-900s would be in service for Delta Connection.

On January 4, 2012, Pinnacle's fleet grew when its parent company moved aircraft and personnel from Mesaba Airlines, which ceased operations when the operating certificate was returned to the FAA. It also acquired personnel from Colgan Air after it ceased operations on September 5, 2012.

Endeavor Air 
On April 1, 2012, Pinnacle's parent company and its subsidiaries filed for bankruptcy protection under Chapter 11 of the United States Bankruptcy Code. The airline discontinued its operation of its Saab 340 and Bombardier Q400 turboprop aircraft by the end of November 2012. On May 1, 2013, Pinnacle Airlines Corporation emerged from Chapter 11 reorganization as a wholly owned subsidiary of Delta Air Lines. After restructuring, the airline was renamed to Endeavor Air, its headquarters were moved to Minneapolis, Minnesota, and agreements with Delta were made to operate 76-seat and 50-seat regional jets.

On October 27, 2016, Endeavor Air adopted EDV as its new ICAO airline code and "Endeavor" as its callsign, replacing its previous code of FLG and "Flagship" callsign.

In March 2017, Endeavor announced it would be re-opening an Atlanta crew and maintenance base, operating CRJ-200 aircraft at this hub. By July 2017, Endeavor had five crew and ten maintenance bases. CRJ-900 operations were added to Atlanta later in the year, with the transfer of aircraft from ExpressJet. The CRJ-700 was introduced in 2018.

Endeavor grew further in 2019 with the addition of aircraft from GoJet Airlines and new deliveries of 70-seat CRJ-900 aircraft.

Death of the former CEO 
On September 27, 2018, former Pinnacle Airlines CEO Philip Trenary was shot dead in Memphis, Tennessee, in an apparent drive-by shooting. Authorities say Trenary was killed in a shooting on South Front Street in downtown Memphis about 8 p.m. Trenary also served as the CEO of the Greater Memphis Chamber.

Destinations & Bases 

Endeavor Air operates crew and maintenance bases at:

Crew bases 
 Atlanta
 Cincinnati
 Detroit
 Minneapolis/St. Paul
 New York–JFK
 New York–LaGuardia
 All crew bases also serve as maintenance bases.

Maintenance bases 
 Des Moines
 Indianapolis
 Knoxville
 Mosinee
 Raleigh/Durham

Fleet 
, Endeavor Air operates the following aircraft:

Incidents and accidents 
 On December 1, 1993, Northwest Airlink Flight 5719 (operated by Express II) collided with trees and crashed while on approach to Chisholm-Hibbing Airport in Hibbing, Minnesota. All sixteen passengers and both pilots were killed.  An investigation revealed that the captain had a history of intimidating and hostile behavior toward the first officers.  The captain's actions during the flight led to a breakdown in communication between the pilots, who lost track of their altitude while attempting a night landing in poor weather.
 On October 14, 2004, Pinnacle Airlines Flight 3701 crashed in a residential area in Jefferson City, Missouri. It was on an empty repositioning flight from Little Rock, Arkansas, to Minneapolis and lost power in both engines when the crew attempted to exceed the CRJ-200's capabilities and reach its maximum certified operating altitude. They were unable to restart the engines and made an unsuccessful attempt to glide the aircraft to Jefferson City. Both crew members were killed.
On March 11, 2005, a CRJ200 operating as Northwest Airlink Flight 2823 from LaGuardia Airport in New York to Milwaukee, Wisconsin, ran off the runway on landing. One of the aircraft's hydraulic systems lost pressure in flight, resulting in the aircraft's ground spoilers not deploying on landing. Contributing to the incident was a crosswind approaching company- and aircraft limits further complicated by reduced braking ability on the runway, which was covered with snow at the time. The aircraft suffered substantial damage from colliding with signage and lighting and was further damaged by the crew's attempt to taxi to the gate. None of the 12 aboard were injured, and the aircraft was repaired.
On April 12, 2007, Pinnacle Airlines flight 4712 overran the runway upon landing at Cherry Capital Airport in Traverse City, Michigan, after a flight from Minneapolis.  The CRJ200 was damaged, but none of the 52 passengers and crew were injured. The NTSB determined that the cause of the accident was the "pilots’ decision to land at TVC without performing a landing distance assessment" which in turn was caused by fatigued pilots and ambiguous runway condition reports from the snowplow crew operating at the time. The report recommended more landing distance training, post-accident drug testing, and further criteria for runway closures in snow and ice conditions.
 The FAA fined Pinnacle over $1 million for allegedly operating two Canadair Regional Jets in 2009 and 2010 that were not in compliance with FAA regulations. On one of the aircraft, the flight crew performed procedures that should have been conducted by maintenance personnel. FAA inspectors had denied a request to make the work an operations task. On a second aircraft, Pinnacle was accused of failing to conduct proper monitoring of a cracked low-pressure turbine case.
On January 24, 2012, a Pinnacle CRJ200 was damaged beyond repair at T.F. Green Airport in Providence, Rhode Island. A piece of ground equipment to which the aircraft was connected caught fire, severely damaging the aircraft's electrical systems.
On January 5, 2014, an Endeavor Air CRJ200, operating as Delta Connection Flight 4100, arrived safely at John F. Kennedy International Airport but slid off the taxiway while exiting the runway. The airport was closed shortly afterward because of ice and snow.
On May 19, 2018, an Endeavor Air CRJ900, operating as Delta Connection Flight 3359, slid off of the runway upon landing at Blue Grass Airport in Lexington, Kentucky, and became stuck in the grass. Weather reports at the time indicated wind shear and heavy rain at the airport. No injuries were reported, and passengers were taken to the terminal by bus. The airport was closed for several hours afterward, resulting in several other inbound flights diverting to other airports.
On January 21, 2022, an Endeavor Air CRJ900, operating as Delta Connection Flight 5501, en route from Ronald Reagan Washington National Airport landed safely at Raleigh–Durham International Airport in Raleigh, North Carolina. While exiting runway 5L/23R, the aircraft became stuck in the grass. The cause of the incident was due to snowy and icy conditions in the area at the time. No injuries were reported, and passengers were taken to the terminal via bus. The runway was closed for several hours and forced an emergency operation to remove snow from the other runway to keep the airfield open. The results of the runway closure caused many flights inbound to RDU to divert to other airports.

See also 
Air transportation in the United States

References

External links 

Delta Air Lines
Airlines established in 1985
Airlines based in Minnesota
Companies based in Minneapolis
Regional airlines of the United States
Regional Airline Association members
SkyTeam affiliate members
Companies that filed for Chapter 11 bankruptcy in 2012
American companies established in 1985